is a Japanese ski jumper. He competed at the 1968 Winter Olympics, the 1972 Winter Olympics and the 1972 Winter Olympics.

References

1945 births
Living people
Japanese male ski jumpers
Japanese male Nordic combined skiers
Olympic ski jumpers of Japan
Olympic Nordic combined skiers of Japan
Nordic combined skiers at the 1968 Winter Olympics
Ski jumpers at the 1972 Winter Olympics
Ski jumpers at the 1976 Winter Olympics
Sportspeople from Hokkaido